Siege of Sardis may refer to:

Siege of Sardis (547 BC), the last decisive conflict after the Battle of Thymbra, which was fought between the forces of Croesus of Lydia and Cyrus the Great
Siege of Sardis (498 BC) between the people of Sardis and an alliance of Greeks from Ionia, Athens, and Eretria
Siege of Sardis (211 BC), fought between usurper Achaeus and the Seleucid Empire